Zoltán Tildy Jr. (6 June 1917 – 22 March 1994) was a Hungarian publisher, photographer, and writer, the son of Prime Minister and President of Hungary Zoltán Tildy.

Biography

Zoltán Tildy Jr. was born in Dombóvár on 6 June 1917 to minister Zoltán Tildy (1889–1961) and Erzsébet Gyenis (1896–1985), who had married in 1916. His father served as Prime Minister of Hungary from 1945 until 1946, and President of Hungary from 1946 until 1948. Tildy began taking photographs at the age of 15. He had one sister, Erzsébet (1918–2012) and one brother, László (1921–1983). He obtained his law degree in 1941. Zoltán Tildy Jr. was an employee of the Hungarian Publishing Company from 1941 until 1942. In 1956 Tildy was a founding member of the Hungarian Photographers Association. His work included landscapes as well as pictures of animals.

References

Hungarian photographers
Children of prime ministers of Hungary
1917 births
1994 deaths